Vice-Admiral Sir Maurice Swynfen Fitzmaurice,  (12 August 1870 – 23 January 1927) was an officer of the Royal Navy.

He served in a number of campaigns in Africa, being twice mentioned in despatches, and had risen to the rank of captain prior to the outbreak of World War I. He served in the Mediterranean, where his ship was sunk by a submarine, and was later appointed to a number of staff posts. He collected a number of awards for his services in the war, and after its end became Director of Naval Intelligence. He died in 1927 while serving as Commander in Chief, Africa, located in Simonstown.

Career
Maurice Fitzmaurice was born on 12 August 1870, the son of John Gerald Fitzmaurice and Florence Augusta Marian Boyrenson.

He entered the British Navy and took part in the Gambia Campaign in 1894. For his services in this conflict he was mentioned in despatches. He went on to see action in the East African Campaign in 1898, during which he was wounded, and again was mentioned in despatches. Fitzmaurice was active in the Second Boer War between 1899 and 1901. He was promoted to commander on 31 December 1902, and to captain on 30 June 1910.

During World War I he captained the battleship , from 5 August 1914 until her loss during the Dardanelles Campaign in 1915. Triumph was torpedoed by the German submarine SM U-21 on 25 May. As she capsized Fitzmaurice was thrown into the water 'as though he had been shot from a gun'. He was picked up by a destroyer after several minutes in the water, apparently with his monocle still firmly in place. He then served as Principal Naval Transport Officer, Dardanelles and Salonika from 1915 until 1916, and then Chief of Staff, Eastern Mediterranean until 1917.

Fitzmaurice received a number of awards, including several from foreign powers, for his service during the war. He was made a Companion of the Order of St Michael and St George in 1916, and the award of the Second Class of the Order of the Sacred Treasure, a Japanese honour, in 1917. Further awards followed, and by the end of the war he was an Officer of the Legion d'honneur and had been awarded the War Cross and the Royal Order of the Redeemer by Greece.

He became a rear-admiral on 26 November 1920, and was Director of Naval Intelligence between 1921 and 1924, after which he became commander in chief on the Africa Station on 12 December 1924. He became a Companion of the Order of the Bath in 1922 and a Knight Commander of the Royal Victorian Order in 1925.

Sir Maurice Fitzmaurice reached the rank of vice-admiral in 1926 and died on 23 January 1927, aged 56. He was at the time Commander-in-Chief, Africa.

Family and personal life
Fitzmaurice was a keen musician, and a Director of the Royal Academy of Music, a member of the Royal College of Organists, and a Fellow of the Royal Philharmonic Society. He played the organ, and enjoyed the works of J. S. Bach.

Fitzmaurice married Mabel Gertrude Gray, the daughter of Samuel Gray, a pastoralist and politician in New South Wales, on 13 October 1896. The couple had two children: Gerald Gray Fitzmaurice (born 24 October 1901; rose to be a distinguished judge) and Maurice James Fitzmaurice (born 1 January 1903; joined the Royal Air Force; attained the rank of Pilot Officer but died in a flying accident on 14 July 1923).

References

Sources

External links
 

|-

1870 births
1927 deaths
Royal Navy vice admirals
Knights Commander of the Royal Victorian Order
Companions of the Order of St Michael and St George
Companions of the Order of the Bath
Officiers of the Légion d'honneur
Recipients of the Order of the Sacred Treasure, 2nd class
Recipients of the War Cross (Greece)
Royal Navy officers of World War I
People associated with the Royal Academy of Music
Directors of Naval Intelligence
People educated at Stubbington House School